Whap or WHAP may refer to:
 "Whap", an episode of Harper's Island
 AP World History, a high school college credit course offered by the Advanced Placement Program
 WHAP, a sports radio station in Hopewell, Virginia